Henry Ward Johnson (May 21, 1906 – August 20, 1982) was a pitcher who played in Major League Baseball between the 1925 and 1939 seasons. He was born in Bradenton, Florida.

Johnson entered the majors in 1925 with the New York Yankees, playing for them seven years (1925–26, 1928–32) before joining the Boston Red Sox (1933–35), Philadelphia Athletics (1936) and Cincinnati Reds (1939). He divided his playing time as a starter, middle reliever, and occasional closer during a career hampered by illness. His most productive years came with the Yankees, winning 14 games in 1928 and 1930 and 13 in 1931. But he developed a chronic bursitis that eventually ended his career.

In a 12-season career, Johnson posted a 63–56 record with 568 strikeouts and a 4.75 ERA in 249 appearances, including 116 starts, 45 complete games, four shutouts, 11 saves and 1066 innings of work.

Johnson was a good hitting pitcher in his major league career. He compiled a .215 batting average (81-for-376) with 48 runs, 2 home runs and 32 RBIs.

After baseball Johnson was in auto sales and county constable. He died in his hometown of Bradenton, Florida at age 76.

References

External links

1906 births
1982 deaths
Boston Red Sox players
Cincinnati Reds players
New York Yankees players
Philadelphia Athletics players
Major League Baseball pitchers
Baseball players from Florida
Bradenton Growers players
St. Paul Saints (AA) players
Milwaukee Brewers (minor league) players
Syracuse Chiefs players
Montreal Royals players
Birmingham Barons players
Memphis Chickasaws players
Sportspeople from Bradenton, Florida